Sérgio Ricardo da Silva Pinto (born 16 October 1980) is a Portuguese former professional footballer who played as a right winger.

Having spent more than one decade playing in Germany, mainly with Schalke 04 and Hannover 96, he possessed dual nationality. He amassed Bundesliga totals of 212 matches and 21 goals, over ten seasons.

Club career

Early years and Schalke
Born in Vila Nova de Gaia, Porto District, Pinto played four years with FC Porto's youth teams, moving to Germany at the age of 12 with his family and settling in the North Rhine-Westphalia town of Haltern am See. He then continued his football grooming at TuS Haltern.

In 1999, Pinto made his Bundesliga debut with FC Schalke 04 after playing four years at the club as a youth, appearing twice for the first team in the 1999–2000 season, the first game being a 3–2 away loss against Bayer Leverkusen on 11 September. Most of his spell, however, was spent with the reserves, as he only took part in 21 matches more in four years.

Alemannia Aachen
Pinto signed for Alemannia Aachen of the second division for 2004–05, for a transfer fee of €125,000. He amassed 58 league appearances in his first two years whilst scoring eight goals, achieving promotion in his second; on 25 November 2005, after helping to a 2–1 home win over SC Paderborn, he received the Tor des Monats (Goal of the Month) award from the ARD.

In the subsequent top-flight campaign, Pinto appeared regularly for the North Rhine-Westphalia side, netting in a 2–0 victory at Energie Cottbus on 10 March 2007, but the team eventually finished second from bottom and suffered relegation. In the ensuing summer, he reunited with former Aachen coach Dieter Hecking at Hannover 96, joining on a three-year contract.

Hannover 96

Pinto played his first official game for his new club on 11 August 2007, starting and being replaced in the second half of a 1–0 home loss against Hamburger SV. He contributed 31 games and five goals – notably in a 3–1 win over Bayern Munich also at the Niedersachsenstadion– in the 2010–11 season as Hannover finished fourth and qualified to the UEFA Europa League, where he added 14/2 in an eventual quarter-final exit.

In late October 2011, following another league home defeat of Bayern (2–1), Pinto was accused by his opponents of "poor sportsmanship". He finally left the Lower Saxony side in June 2013, aged nearly 33 and with 193 competitive appearances to his credit.

Late career
On 6 July 2013, Pinto moved to Levante UD from Spain, agreeing to a two-year deal. He played his first La Liga match on 18 August, featuring the first 45 minutes in a 7–0 away loss to Barcelona.

Pinto returned to Germany on 9 June 2014, signing a one-year contract with Fortuna Düsseldorf. He was released on 30 May 2016.

References

External links

1980 births
Living people
German people of Portuguese descent
Naturalized citizens of Germany
Sportspeople from Vila Nova de Gaia
Portuguese footballers
German footballers
Association football wingers
Bundesliga players
2. Bundesliga players
TuS Haltern players
FC Schalke 04 players
Alemannia Aachen players
Hannover 96 players
Fortuna Düsseldorf players
La Liga players
Levante UD footballers
Portuguese expatriate footballers
Expatriate footballers in Germany
Expatriate footballers in Spain
Portuguese expatriate sportspeople in Germany
Portuguese expatriate sportspeople in Spain
German expatriate sportspeople in Spain